Taxis of Singapore come in two main varieties. Traditional taxi companies (such as ComfortDelGro, Strides Taxis, TransCab, Premier Taxis Silvercab or Prime Taxis) offer flag down and call bookings and their drivers are hired employees of the company. Ridesharing companies (such as Grab, Ryde, TADA and Go-Jek) allow bookings through a smartphone, allowing ease for passengers, these are mostly known as private hire vehicles (PHV). Their apps also allow the flexibility to work and pick up passengers with their own vehicle, be it owned or rented, provided the various requirements are met depending on the company.

Taxis may be flagged down at any time of the day along any public road outside of the Central Business District (CBD), while private hire cars may be booked via ridesharing apps. Issues of high traffic and demand in certain locations and areas, particularly in the downtown area and other major buildings and establishments around the island, require the building of taxi stands instead of having only flag down taxis.

As of December 2021, there were 14,887 taxis and 67,990 PHVs in Singapore.

Operations
Taxis and private hire cars are predominantly operated by large companies, which require either a street-hail service operator licence (SSOL) or ride-hail service operator licence (RSOL) from the Land Transport Authority (LTA). Holders of the SSOL and RSOL are required to comply with LTA's Quality of Service (QoS) standards, codes of practice and audit directions, failure of which the LTA may revoke the licence.

While there are a small number of privately operated Yellow-Top taxis (with a yellow top and black body), their numbers are continually shrinking since no new private licenses have been issued since the 1970s, existing licenses are not transferable, and their holders have to retire at age 75. The number of taxis in the group also has declined significantly due to competition from Grab.

As of February 2021, there are 9 taxi and ridesharing companies in Singapore.

All taxi and private hire car drivers in Singapore are required to hold a valid Taxi Driver's Vocational Licence (TDVL) or Private Hire Car Driver's Vocational Licence (PDVL) issued by the Land Transport Authority, after having met basic prerequisites and successfully completed a training course in the Singapore Taxi Academy and passing a theory test. Holders of the licence may then rent a taxi or private hire car on a daily rental basis.

As of December 2021, there were a total of 94,642 TDVL holders in Singapore and 48,523 PDVL holders in Singapore.

Fares
Fares on Singapore's taxis are considered relatively affordable, and are thus a popular form of transportation in Singapore, particularly for the upper-middle income groups. Taxi fares were regulated by the Public Transport Council until September 1998 to allow operators full freedom in setting their own fares in a bid to introduce greater competition in the market.

Normal taxi fares are metered at $0.24 for every 400 m thereafter or less which is less than 10 km and again every 350m thereafter or less which is more than 10 km, and it is an offence for taxi drivers to disable, tamper with, or fail to use their metering devices. Drivers found guilty may be fined up to S$500. Higher metered fares applies to the limousine vehicles at $0.33. The normal flagdown fares varies from $3.90 to $4.10. Waiting can be done at $0.24 for every 45 seconds or less, booking can be done at $2.90 or $3.30. The peak hours are from Monday to Friday, 6am - 9.30 am and 6.00 pm - 12.00 am, and has a surcharge of 25% of the metered fare. The public holiday surcharge is 25% of the metered fare, and whereas for late night, it is 50% of the metered fare. There is also a CBD surcharge of $3, together with Changi Airport surcharge at $5 on weekends from 5.00 pm to 12.00 am, and $3 at all other times. Others include $3 for Seletar Airport, $3 for Resorts World Sentosa and Singapore Expo.

For the flat fares, under ComfortDelGro and Grab, there is also a $5 surcharge for extra stop made outside the booking.

Stringent requirements ensure that all taxis are fitted with meters. Drivers who fail to utilise their meters may be fined up to S$500, an enforced rule which brings fare disputes down to a minimum.

Safety
As of 2018, about 70% of taxis in Singapore are equipped with airbags. then Second Minister for Transport, Ng Chee Meng, state that airbag is a supporting safety feature and does not make it a mandatory requirement for taxis. Nevertheless, with the introduction of newer vehicles, it is expected that more taxis will be equipped with airbags.

History
Taxicabs were first introduced in Singapore in 1910 by C.F. Wearne and Co., using taximeters imported from the United Kingdom installed in Rover cars. The Straits Times claimed that Singapore was the second city in the East with a taxi service, after Calcutta. In 1919, The Singapore Motor Taxi Cab and Transport Co. Ltd., which planned to work with the municipal government to set up a taxi service, was proposed, but the plans fell through. In 1933, Wearnes introduced the first private Yellow-Top taxis. These cabs were the first of their kind in colonial Singapore.

The 1950s and 1960s
In the 1960s, with the poor state of Singapore's public transportation, pirate taxis proliferated. These taxis were uninsured and often overcrowded with passengers. The police tried to mitigate the issue by discouraging people from taking such taxis, but their efforts had little effect, a result of problems faced with finding witnesses to testify against pirate taxi owners. The police also started sending undercover agents to deal with these taxis, but the number of pirate taxis continued to increase, detrimentally impacting bus and licensed taxi operators. In February 1966, a committee was set up by the Singapore government to review the policy on taxis and taxi drivers, especially with respect to taxi licenses. The committee completed its report by June that year, in which it recommended an increase in the number of licensed taxis, along with the legalisation of pirate taxis for the sole purpose of transporting schoolchildren. The report also recommended against increasing the number of taxi licenses. In addition, penalties for pirate taxi operators were increased, with higher fines and prison terms for up to six months. In October 1966, with new government regulation, licensed taxis were required to have a two-tone black and yellow livery, and be fitted with a lit sign with the word 'Taxi" on the roof.

The 1970s, 1980s and 1990s
By 1970, with the implementation of a diesel tax and an additional 1,200 licenses for taxis, the government announced plans to phase out pirate taxis. In May that year, the National Trades Union Congress (NTUC) announced plans to provide a cooperative taxi and minibus service, and to get former pirate taxi drivers to drive the minibuses as part of the cooperative. In July 1970, a taxi stop scheme was trialled on four streets in the central area, in which taxis could only stop at designated taxi stops. Despite concerns over inconvenience and confusion raised by the Taxi Driver's Association, the Registry of Vehicles declared the trial a success and went on to expand the scheme. Pirate and school taxis were eventually phased out by July 1971.

NTUC's taxi cooperative, named 'Comfort', started operations in 1971 with a fleet of 1,000 taxis, with the first taxis entering service at the end of January that year.

In June 1981, electronic meters were introduced to the taxis. TIBS Taxis was formed in 1987, and was renamed to SMRT Taxis on 10 May 2004.

In 1995, CityCab was formed with the merger of SBS Taxi, Singapore Commuter and Singapore Airport Bus Services. In April 1998, CityCab had introduced MaxiCab (a 7-seater cab).

The 2000s
In November 2006, NETS payment was made available for the first time in taxis in Singapore, and in September 2009, online taxi booking was introduced. In February 2010, ComfortDelGro taxi booking app was launched for the iPhone users, and this is followed in June 2011 to the Android and Blackberry users after the elections. In December 2013, in-vehicle cameras were installed in all ComfortDelGro taxis.

In January 2007, ComfortDelGro is the first taxi operator to introduce new generation of taxis, which is Hyundai Sonata, followed by Toyota Camry (Natural Gas Retrofit) in 2008, whereas Yellow-Top had purchased Fiat Panorama and Fiat Croma JTD. ComfortDelGro had announced that it will be purchasing Hyundai Sonata and Hyundai i40 vehicles after which it was replaced by Toyota Prius and Hyundai Ioniq Hybrid.

On 11 July 2008, ComfortDelGro announced the implementation of a $0.30 fuel surcharge starting from 17 July. Other taxi companies except Prime Taxis followed suit with different implementation dates. ComfortDelGro Yellow-Top taxis has ceased to exist in October 2007.

On 25 January 2008, the Land Transport Authority announced that it will also set up a common call booking telephone number for taxis by July 2008, to complement the taxi companies’ call booking systems, which is called +65 6342 5222 (Common Taxi Booking Number). In March 2008, street hail in the central business district was disallowed, but it was released in stages, without buses plying in the first phase from 17 March 2009, the second phase involved shortening the time to full-day bus lane hours from 23 February 2012 and finally, it was eased on every road except full-day and half-day bus lanes from January 2013.

Since 2008, SMRT Taxis had purchased various taxis, ranging from Chrysler 300C, Hyundai Azera, SsangYong Rodius and Hyundai Starex. The first Chevrolet Epica was delivered in May 2011, to the no success between TransCab and SMRT Taxis. All the Chevrolet Epica vehicles were retired by 2019. SMRT Taxis had purchased Toyota Prius since 2013 and currently operates till today.

On 30 September 2013, Smart Taxis ceased operation. The LTA transferred some taxis from Smart Taxis to TransCab.

In September 2014, the last Toyota Crown and Nissan Cedric were scrapped from various taxi operators. This marks the end of $3.00 flagdown taxis.

Late 2010s: Age of disruptive transport
The taxi industry has fallen in the decline since 2017 coupled with many car drivers scrapping the passenger cars over the years, together with the COE reaching zero growth.

In 2017, regulations to safeguard commuter interests were introduced with the advent of the private hire car operators, Uber and Grab - the requirement to have a Private Hire Car Driver's Vocational Licence (PDVL), as well as tamper-proof blue colour decals. Taxi driver licences are also standardised to become the Taxi Driver's Vocational Licence (TDVL). They are required to only dispatch insured and licensed vehicles.

On 10 April 2017, ComfortDelGro offers flat fares without surge pricing for the first time and chalks up to 100,000 jobs in 10 days. In June 2017, it had launched the CabRewards+ Programme which rewards commuters who travel on bus, trains and taxi. On 1 August 2017, ComfortDelGro is the first in Asia to extend Masterpass payments to street hail. In December 2017, ComfortDelGro and Uber had formed the alliance, and in January 2018, it had launched UberFLASH. ComfortDelGro launches ComfortRIDE, a new booking service whose fares adjusts according to market supply and demand, which replaces Flat Fare on 15 May 2019 before reaching two million mark in August 2019. ComfortDelGro had also planned to extend the service to private hire cars.

Several taxi companies had applied to implement dynamic pricing since February 2017. Since 22 March 2017, Grab has planned to implement this called JustGrab on 29 March 2017, that brings taxi companies into the scene of fixed rates (SMRT Taxis, TransCab, Premier Taxis, Prime Taxis and HDT Taxi were involved).

In January 2018, Compressed Natural Gas taxicabs were discontinued which is from TransCab, and uses the Toyota Wish vehicles since 2010.

In May 2018, Uber had merged its operations with Grab to form Grab. Later on, more taxi operators also came into the scene including the conversion of trial-based electric taxi operator HDT Taxis (Hold Dreams Together) to a full-scale taxi licence. These include Ryde, TADA and Gojek, whereas some of the operators were short-lived - Kardi, Jugnoo, Filo Ride and Urge. Gojek was introduced in November 2018, pilot trial began without surge pricing and was restricted to DBS/OCBC card users before the full launch to all users on 11 January 2019. Additionally, more taxi operators tied on with ride-hailing giants to introduce flat fares, out of which TransCab had signed up with Ryde on 26 September 2019 and Gojek on 29 November 2019. Similarly, Premier Taxis had signed up with TADA on 19 February 2019, that had combined both taxis and private cars, followed by introducing a Smart Call feature on 20 May 2019.

After the loss of Uber in May 2018, taxis had revived, but ComfortDelGro has bought 2,400 taxis in the revived demand in three phases. In July 2018, ComfortDelGro Taxi had trialed first fast-charging fully-electric Hyundai Ioniq taxis in Singapore. Trial of fully electric taxi was expanded to include long range Hyundai Kona electric taxis that boasts battery power twice that of the Ioniq in January 2019. Additionally, TransCab will also purchase Toyota Prius taxis which will also be delivered from January 2019.

In 2019, there was a review on the Point-to-Point Passenger Transport Industry Act. The idea of setting a fare cap is being done. Surge pricing is only allowed on the fixed fare bookings, where fare levels are displayed upfront before showing the ride.

Early 2020s: Adapting to the new normal

Due to the coronavirus pandemic, taxi demand plunged between early and mid 2020 due to changing commuter habits and workplace habits such as working from home. Electric taxi operator HDT was affected due to the pandemic and ceased operations and to focus on its other subsidiaries operating other green transportation solutions.

Livery

ComfortDelgro (Comfort and CityCab) Taxis

Strides Taxis

TransCab

Silvercab

Prime Taxis

See also

 Transport in Singapore	
 Taxis of Hong Kong
 Taxis by country

References

 
Transport in Singapore